Viktor Kossakovsky (born 19 July 1961) is a Russian documentary filmmaker.

Early life
Kossakovsky was born in Saint Petersburg, Russia, at the time Leningrad, U.S.S.R. He began his film career in 1978, working as an assistant cameraman, assistant director, and editor at the Leningrad Studio of Documentaries. From 1986 to 1988, he studied screenwriting and directing at Moscow HCSF. He became a vegetarian during his childhood.

Career
Kossakovsky's first released feature was his 1992 documentary Belovy / The Belovs. Subsequent works include his 2002 documentary Hush! / Tishe! and his 2003 documentary Russia from My Window (2003), both made from footage that Kossakovsky filmed out his bedroom window or on his street in St. Petersburg; and his well-received mediation on the natural wonder of water, Aquarela (2018), released in the U.S. by Sony Pictures Classics. In 2011, his documentary ¡Vivan las Antipodas! was selected as the opening film of the Venice Film Festival..

Awards
 
In 1993, his first feature, Belovy / The Belovs, won both the VPRO Joris Ivens Award and the Audience Award.
 
Other awards include the Special Jury Award at the International Documentary Film Festival Amsterdam for Pavel i Lyalya in 1999, the Documentary Award at the Edinburgh International Film Festival for Sreda (Wednesday), the Award of Honor  at Karlovy Vary International Film Festival for Sreda, the Dok Leipzig Findling Award for Pavel i Lyala, the True Vision Award at the 2012 True/False Film Festival and the Genziana d'Oro – Gran Premio Città di Trento at the 60th Trento Film Festival (2012)..

Filmography
Gunda (documentary) (2020)
Aquarela (documentary) (2018)
Demonstration (documentary) (2013)
DisplAir (documentary short) (2012)
¡Vivan las Antipodas! / Long Live the Antipodes! (documentary) (2011)
Svyato (documentary short) (2005)
Russia from my Window / Россия из моего окна (2003)
I Loved You / Я любил тебя (documentary) (2003)
Hush! / Тише! / Tishe! (2002)
Wednesday 07.19.61 / Среда 19.07.61 (documentary short) (1999)
Pavel i Lyala / Павел и Ляля (documentary) (1998)
Belovy / Беловы / The Belovs (documentary) (1994)

References

External links

    Master Class for Beginners at IDFA
    Victor Kossakovsky Advice for Beginners

1961 births
Living people
Russian film directors
High Courses for Scriptwriters and Film Directors alumni
Mass media people from Saint Petersburg